The Mesquite Desert Dogs were an American professional basketball team based in Mesquite, Nevada.

History
On October 30, 2017, North American Premier Basketball (NAPB) announced a team would play in Mesquite, Nevada, for the league's inaugural 2018 season. On October 31, Paul Mokeski was named the head coach and general manager. On November 13, the team name was revealed as the Nevada Desert Dogs.

After the inaugural NAPB season, the league was rebranded as The Basketball League (TBL) and on August 16, 2018, Mokeski was named the commissioner of the league. The Nevada Desert Dogs were also renamed the Mesquite Desert Dogs and assistant coach Carlnel Wiley was promoted to head coach and general manager for the 2019 season.

Sometime during the second season, the Desert Dogs changed its primary home venue to the Virgin Valley High School gymnasium, with at least one home game Hughes Middle School. The league and team continued to have issues with canceled games thougout the season, but the Desert Dogs qualified for a playoff spot.

Prior to the 2020 season, all the other west coast teams in The Basketball League either ceased operations or folded. The Desert Dogs were the last to withdraw, citing travel costs as the last remaining west coast team on November 18, 2019.

References

Basketball teams in Nevada
Former The Basketball League teams
2017 establishments in Nevada
Basketball teams established in 2017
Mesquite, Nevada
Basketball in Las Vegas
2019 disestablishments in Nevada
Basketball teams disestablished in 2019